Carbonate may refer to:

Places
Carbonate, Colorado, a ghost town in Garfield County, Colorado
 Carbonate, Lombardy, a comune in the Province of Como
 Carbonate, South Dakota, a ghost town in Lawrence County, South Dakota

Science and technology
 Carbonate, a salt containing the carbonate anion, 
 Carbonate minerals, a class of minerals containing the carbonate anion
 Carbonate rocks
Carbonate ester, an of carbonic acid, general structure R1O(C=O)OR2

See also 
Carbonation